The Lipeón Formation is a Telychian to Pridoli geologic formation of southern Bolivia and northwestern Argentina. The formation comprises sandstones and siltstones. Plant fossils comprising rhyniophytes (specifically Aberlemnia, Steganotheca, Tarrantia, Hostinella and Cooksonia) are scattered throughout, with some abundant concentrations on micaceous bedding plains. The fossil flora is the oldest of South America. Also present were quite diverse small, irregularly branching fragments possibly the tips of algae
such as Buthotrephis or Hungerfordia.

Correlations 
The Lipeón Formation is laterally equivalent to the Kirusillas Formation. The formation is a potential source rock for shale oil and shale gas.

Fossil content 
The formation has provided the following fossils:

 Ornatosinuitina reyesi
 Slimonia boliviana
 Styliolina sp.
 Lingulata indet.
Flora
 Aberlemnia
 Cooksonia
 Hostinella
 Steganotheca
 Tarrantia

See also 
 List of fossiliferous stratigraphic units in Bolivia
 Kirusillas Formation
 Llallagua Formation

References

Bibliography

Further reading 
 
 B. Petriella and R. Suarez Soruco. 1989. Presencia de plantas terrestres, probablemente vosculares, en las formaciones Kirusillas y Tarabuco (Lampayano-Silurico Superior) de Bolivia. Revista Tecnica de YPFB 10:119-121
 C. J. Fischer. 1969. Deux bellerophontacées nouveaux de Bolive. Bulletin de Societé géologique, France 7:605-608

Geologic formations of Argentina
Geologic formations of Bolivia
Silurian System of South America
Silurian Argentina
Silurian Bolivia
Homerian
Sandstone formations
Siltstone formations
Deltaic deposits
Shallow marine deposits
Silurian southern paleotemperate deposits
Fossiliferous stratigraphic units of South America
Paleontology in Bolivia
Formations
Geology of Jujuy Province